Plum Trees is an unincorporated community in Curry County, Oregon, United States. Sixes River Road runs by Plum Trees, which is adjacent to the Rogue River – Siskiyou National Forest slightly north of Grassy Knob Wilderness in the Klamath Mountains.

References

Unincorporated communities in Curry County, Oregon
Unincorporated communities in Oregon